Megaloglossus is a genus of bats in the family Pteropodidae. It is native to Africa. It contains two species, Megaloglossus azagnyi and Megaloglossus woermanni. Prior to 2012, it was considered a monotypic genus. In 2012, however, M. woermanni was split into two species with the description of M. azagnyi. It was described as a new species in 2012.

Range
Both species are found in West and Central Africa.

References

Bat genera
Megabats